The Coffee Bean & Tea Leaf (sometimes shortened to simply "Coffee Bean" or "The Coffee Bean", often abbreviated as CBTL) is an American coffee shop chain founded in 1963. Since 2019, it is a trade name of Ireland-based Super Magnificent Coffee Company Ireland Limited. Its 80%   stake is by multinational company Jollibee Foods Corporation. It operates as an independent subsidiary and remains headquartered in Los Angeles, California. 

As of 2017, the chain had over 1,000 self-owned and franchised stores in the United States and 31 in other countries.

History

The company was founded by Herbert Hyman (1931–2014) in September 1963, as a coffee service for offices. His wife Mona (whom he married in 1966) and he honeymooned in Sweden where they discovered quality coffee. This sparked the decision to import, roast and sell gourmet coffee in Los Angeles, opening the first Coffee Bean store in 1968 in the Los Angeles neighborhood of Brentwood. Innovations included selling whole beans and touting their country of origin and allowing customers to observe the beans being roasted and then to sample varieties before making a purchase. Hyman died on April 28, 2014, at the age of 82.

By the 1970s the firm had expanded to 10 stores in Southern California and had added exotic teas to the menu. In the summer of 1987 an employee brought a blender to a Westwood store where he mixed together ice, coffee extract and chocolate powder, paving the way for the company's signature Ice Blended drinks. With the invention of the Ice Blended, the chain saw a surge in popularity. The drink was a predecessor to the Starbucks Frappuccino. In 1991, when it was first planning to expand into Los Angeles, Starbucks tried to purchase the firm, but Hyman turned them down. The opening of Starbucks stores in Los Angeles unexpectedly helped Coffee Bean's business, by driving curious customers to the area.

In 1996 , the Hymans sold the Asian franchise rights to Singaporean brothers Victor Sassoon and Sunny Sassoon. The Sassoons quickly expanded the company in the US and internationally, opening the first outlet in Singapore in 1996, and in Malaysia the following year. Within two years, they had opened 29 stores in Singapore and Malaysia, almost as many stores as the Hymans had opened in their 35 years of ownership. In 1998, the Sassoons, along with longtime friend Severin Wunderman, purchased the parent company, International Coffee & Tea LLC, from the Hymans, and took it global. Victor Sassoon works out of Singapore, Sunny Sassoon works in Los Angeles, and Wunderman is a silent partner with no role in management. International Coffee & Tea, LLC remains the name of the holding company.

Sunny Sassoon served as president and CEO from 1998 until 2009, when he moved to the executive chairman position until 2019. In 2009, Mel Elias (Sassoon's brother-in-law) assumed the role of president and CEO of the company, after spending seven years as chief operating officer. In September 2013, a significant equity position in Coffee Bean was acquired from International Coffee & Tea by US-based Advent International, in partnership with South Korea-based Mirae Asset Private Equity and Taiwan-based CDIB Capital. The Sassoon family remains a large shareholder. On September 3, 2015, John Fuller assumed the position of president and CEO.

On July 24, 2019, Jollibee Foods Corporation purchased The Coffee Bean and Tea Leaf for $650 million.

Products
The company is known for its Original Ice Blended coffee and tea drinks, hot coffee drinks, and hot and iced tea drinks. It also sells a variety of whole bean coffees, whole leaf teas, flavored powders, and baked goods.

Coffee
The company's coffees fall into seven categories: Light & Subtle, Light & Distinctive, Medium & Smooth, Dark & Distinctive, Decaffeinated, Flavored, and Reserve. It roasts approximately seven million pounds of coffee annually. All of the beans are hand-roasted at its roasting facility in Camarillo, California. The beans come from farms in  Costa Rica, Colombia, Kenya, Indonesia, Jamaica, Thailand, and Sri Lanka. The firm offers several seasonal holiday drinks, in flavors including candy cane, gingerbread, red velvet cake, eggnog, and peppermint. For the company's 50th anniversary in 2013, it introduced a Birthday Cake Ice Blended.

Tea

The company's teas fall into seven categories: Green, Black, Oolong, Herbal Infusion, Decaffeinated, Flavored, and Tea Master's. All of the teas are hand-blended at its facility in Camarillo, California. The Chai Tea Latte, one of the chain's most popular drinks, was first served in 1998. In March 2014, the company introduced its Tea Granita beverage in two flavors, Pear Berry and Passion Fruit.

CBTL single-serve system
CBTL, a single-serve system for home use, was launched in the United States, Singapore, Malaysia, South Korea, and the Philippines in 2010. Several types of single-serve capsules are available for the machines: espresso, coffee, tea, and hot chocolate.

Kosher and halal
All Coffee Bean coffees, teas, and the powders used to make other beverages, are certified kosher. As of June 2020, Coffee Bean ended its storewide kosher-only certification for stores and bakery items in Southern California. Storewide kosher certification was ended for Coffee Bean locations in the Las Vegas area months earlier. While Coffee Bean had planned to move away from kosher-only certification to provide more offerings as a phased rollout before the COVID-19 pandemic, the company said the crisis accelerated its plan.

Prior to June 2020, all company-owned locations in Southern California were certified kosher. During that time, most in California and Nevada had signed and dated certificates indicating that the entirety of their items were kosher in conformance to the standards of the certifying agency, the Kosher Supervision of America. Even before June 2020, privately owned franchise stores could opt-out of kosher certification.

All the company's locations in Singapore and Malaysia are halal.

Locations

, the chain is present in 32 countries, with new stores opened in Japan on May 26, 2015, and in Panama on June 17, 2015.

Partnerships 
On 5 September 2012, Nokia announced a deal with the chain to offer wireless charging facilities in its cafés. On May 28, 2013, Hilton Worldwide announced they had signed an exclusive agreement for Coffee Bean to provide in-room coffee and tea for all Hilton hotels in North America, South America, and Central America.

Green Mountain Coffee Roasters announced on May 29, 2013, that they had partnered with Coffee Bean to create a K-Cup for Keurig single-cup brewing systems, available in the US as of 2014.

On August 24, 2015, the firm announced they had signed an exclusive area development agreement with South Korean retail conglomerate E-LAND to enter into the Chinese market. On July 21, 2020, the Coffee Bean & Tea Leaf entered into a partnership with fast casual chain Smashburger (also owned by Jollibee Foods Corporation), and began incorporating Coffee Bean & Tea Leaf products into their menu.

Controversies

2012: Bathroom spycam scandal

A popular coffee shop chain was under fire for how it addressed repeated discoveries of a bathroom peeping Tom at a couple of its stores, according to a lawsuit filed in Los Angeles Superior Court.
According to Courthouse News, lead plaintiff Roderick Smith discovered the first spy camera nestled in the u-bend of the sink in an Encino, California, Coffee Bean and Tea Leaf store in October 2011. Smith said after he noticed the device inside the bathroom's unisex facilities, he immediately told management at the shop but was told the camera looked more like a flash drive, according to Smith's attorney Brian Kabateck.
In a statement obtained by CBS Los Angeles, the company said: “We believe that our cooperation helped lead to the arrest of the suspect. In light of the pending litigation surrounding this matter, we are unable to comment further at this time.”

2019: Political gaffe in SAF Day discount promotional artwork

The Singapore chain of Coffee Bean & Tea Leaf has apologized for a blunder in its original promotional artwork to mark SAF Day, which featured a soldier in uniform. However, the soldier did not appear to be from the Singapore Armed Forces (SAF). The chain pulled the promotion from its Facebook page shortly after and issued an apology for the mistake. It said: "Our SAF Day Celebration artwork that went out earlier was incorrect. We sincerely apologize for the mistake. Thank you very much for your comments and kind understanding."
A few hours later, Coffee Bean & Tea Leaf shared a new promotional artwork on Facebook that featured an ice-blended drink, instead of a soldier. While some social media users defended the coffee chain, there was still some backlash from others.

Animal cruelty allegations

2018: The backlash from #CatsofBGC controversy
After the news hit that the friendly neighborhood felines of One Bonifacio High Street suddenly disappeared, rumors began to circulate that the adjacent hotel had hired a pest control company called Pestbusters to get rid of them. The angry people of the Internet discovered that The Coffee Bean & Tea Leaf is part of the Table Group, which also runs Pestbusters, the pest control company that “dealt with” the cats. The coffee chain has been implicated by association and is now being disavowed by its patrons.
The Facebook page called Rats of BGC was set up, with an event called "Hanapan ng Pusa sa Shangri-la," with the goal of pointing out that the hotel will rue their decision to get rid of the cats when the rats start pouring in.

2022: Caged eggs in CBTL’s global supply chain
CBTL has been facing negative publicity for its usage of battery-cage eggs in the food it provides in its locations across the globe. Due to the cruel conditions on those farms, as well as the health risks associated with eggs produced in battery cages, the European Union Council Directive 1999/74/EC banned caged farms back in 2012.

See also
 List of coffeehouse chains

References

External links
 

Coffeehouses and cafés in the United States
Food and drink companies based in Los Angeles
Restaurants established in 1963
1963 establishments in California
Jollibee Foods Corporation subsidiaries
American subsidiaries of foreign companies
2019 mergers and acquisitions